Jakob Georg Christian Adler (8 December 1756, in Arnis near Kappeln, Schleswig – 22 August 1834, in Giekau near Lütjenburg) was a Danish-German Generalsuperintendent for Holstein and Schleswig, Orientalist, Syriac language professor at the University of Copenhagen, Lutheran theologian, Oberkonsistorialrat, book writer, religious educator, coin collector and head of the Schleswig-Holsteinische Bibelgesellschaft.

Biography 
Jacob Georg Christian Adler was the son of Georg Christian Adler and a relative of Caspar Aquila and Matthias Claudius. Adler received private education from his father and attended the Christianeum Hamburg. Then he studied theology at the University of Kiel and oriental studies under Oluf Gerhard Tychsen at the University of Bützow and Rostock. He wrote several books on Syriac language and ancient Arabian language, about a long stay in Rome etc.

Work 
 . Kiel: Carl Ernst Bohn 1781 (published by his brother)
 . Altona 1783
 . Hamburg u. Bützow 1773, 2. Aufl., Altona 1792 
 . Hamburg 1779
 . Kopenhagen 1780
 , Bd. I. Rom 1787, Bd. II, Kopenhagen 1792 
 . Kopenhagen 1789
  – Herausgeber des von J. J. Reiske bearbeiteten u. übersetzten Werkes (5 Bde.). Kopenhagen 1789–95

Literature about Adler 
 August Hennings (?): "Schleswig-Holsteinische Kirchen-Agende". In: Der Genius der Zeit 13 (1798), S. 369–375
 H[ennings]., A[ugust].: "Einladung zur Aufmerksamkeit auf einen geheimen, und iezt vielleicht noch allgemein unerkannt gebliebenen Grund der Agende {Streitigkeiten in den Herzogthümern Schleswig und Holstein}". In: Der Genius der Zeit 15 (1798), S. 1–7
 H[ennings]., A[ugust].: "Schleswig Holsteinische Kirchenagende". In: Der Genius der Zeit 15 (1798), S. 404–405

 "Die Vorfahren des Generalsuperintendenten A.", in: Schriftenreihe des Vereins f. schleswig-holsteinische Kirchengeschichte, Rh. 2, Bd. 5, 1910–13; S. 213 ff.
 Anton Baumstark: Geschichte der syrischen Literatur [...] 1922; S. 144
 O. F. Arends: Gejstligheden i Slesvig og Holsten fra Reformationen til 1864 – Personalhistoriske Untersogelser. Kopenhagen 1932
 Dansk biografisk Leksikon, Bd. I. 1933; S. 129 ff.
 F. Rosenthal: Die aramaistischen Forschungen seit dem 20. Jhd. – Nöldeke's Veröffentlichungen. Leiden 1939; S. 144 f.
 Joh. W. Fück: Die arabischen Studien in Europa bis in den Anfang des 20. Jhd., 1955; S. 218 (Fn. S. 557)
 Allg. Deutsche Biographie (55 Bde. und 1 RBd.). Leipzig 1875–1912; Bd. I, S. 85 f.
 Neue Deutsche Biographie. Berlin 1953 ff.; Bd. I, S. 70 f.
 Kurt Galling (Hrsg.): Die Religion in Geschichte und Gegenwart – Handwörterbuch für Theologie und Religionswissenschaft (6 Bde.). Tübingen 1957–1962; RBd. 1965, Teil I, S. 96 f.
 Walter Kasper et al. (Hrsg.): Lexikon für Theologie und Kirche, 3. Aufl. Freiburg 1993 ff.; Bd. I, 148 f. 
Dictionnaire d'histoire et de géographie ecclésiastiques. Paris 1912 ff.; Bd. I, S. 573
Dr. Werner Aquila: Die Nachfahren Leonhard Adlers später Aquila aus Augsburg. Sonderdruck des Genealogischen Jahrbuches (hrsgg. von der Zentralstelle für Personen- und Familiengeschichte, Bd. 44. Neustadt/Aisch: Verlag Degener & Co. 2004)

External links 
 
  de.wikisource.org

1756 births
1834 deaths
People from Schleswig-Flensburg
People from the Duchy of Schleswig
18th-century Latin-language writers
18th-century German writers
German Lutheran theologians
German numismatists
German orientalists
German travel writers
Academic staff of the University of Copenhagen
University of Kiel alumni
German male non-fiction writers
18th-century German male writers
Kartvelian studies scholars